Elijah William Cunningham (1896 – April 17, 1960) was an American sportswriter and college football player and coach.

Cunningham was born in 1896, in Pattonville, Texas. He moved with his parents to Paris, Texas and then to Dallas as child and graduated from Dallas' Terrill School for Boys in 1915. Cunningham then attended Dartmouth College, where he played football before graduating in 1921. He was a second-team selection to the 1920 College Football All-America Team as a center. During World War I, he served in France with the United States Army as a first lieutenant of artillery.

Returning to Dallas, he was hired by the local Dallas Morning News after graduation to be a general assignments reporter. While working for the Morning News, he was allowed to also be an assistant football coach for the 1921 SMU Mustangs. Two games into the season, head coach J. Burton Rix resigned, and SMU named Cunningham as interim head coach for the remainder of the season. He remained an employee of the Morning News while coaching the Mustangs. The team finished with a 1–6–1 record and after the season, as planned, Ray Morrison took over as coach for the upcoming 1922 season.

In 1922, the Boston Post newspaper asked Cunningham to be a guest reporter covering the football game that fall between Centre College and Texas A&M University. The game was a major upset victory for Texas A&M, and after filing his report with the Post, the paper offered him a full-time reporting job in Boston, which he accepted and where he remained for 19 years. He then spent another 19 years at the Boston Herald and became a well-regarded, nationally known sportswriter, columnist and reporter during his almost 40 years in Boston. Cunningham died on April 17, 1960, at his home in Newton, Massachusetts.

Head coaching record

Notes

References

1896 births
1960 deaths
20th-century American male writers
SMU Mustangs football coaches
Dartmouth Big Green football players
United States Army officers
United States Army personnel of World War I
People from Paris, Texas
Coaches of American football from Texas
Players of American football from Dallas
Sportspeople from Newton, Massachusetts
Journalists from Dallas
Journalists from Massachusetts
Writers from Newton, Massachusetts
Sportswriters from Massachusetts
Sportswriters from Texas
The Boston Post people